Tessmannianthus gordonii is a species of plant in the family Melastomataceae. It is endemic to Panama.  It is threatened by habitat loss.

References

Endemic flora of Panama
gordonii
Endangered plants
Taxonomy articles created by Polbot